China competed in the 2009 Asian Martial Arts Games which were held in Bangkok, Thailand from August 1, 2009 to August 9, 2009.

Muay

Taekwondo 

Men

Women

See also
 China at the Asian Games
 China at the Olympics
 Sports in China

China
2009
2009 in Chinese sport